Lò Gò-Xa Mát National Park is a national park in the Southeast region of Vietnam, approximately  from the city of Tây Ninh. It was established by upgrading the status of the former Lò Gò-Xa Mát Nature Reserve.

It is the largest single forested area in Tây Ninh Province, and 177 species of birds and ten mammal species have been confirmed to live in the park boundaries. Biomes include broadleaf tropical forests, and seasonally flooded grasslands.

References

External links 

 Lò Gò-Xa Mát at Tay Ninh Tourism

National parks of Vietnam
Geography of Tây Ninh province
Protected areas established in 2002
2002 establishments in Vietnam